AERD may refer to:

 Aspirin-exacerbated respiratory disease, also known aspirin-induced asthma
 Atheroembolic renal disease, a cholesterol embolism involving the kidneys
 Atomic Energy Research Department, former name for Atomics International

